A leadership election was held on 20 September 2018 to elect the next president of the Liberal Democratic Party of Japan for a new 3-year term. Incumbent president Shinzo Abe was running for re-election after a rule change in 2017 that allowed him to run for a third term.

Abe's victory effectively hands him three more years as prime minister, giving him the chance of breaking the record for the nation's longest-serving prime ministership held by Taro Katsura, a revered politician who served three times between 1901 and 1913. Abe stayed in office through 21 November 2019, which equals 2,886 days marked by Katsura. He also served the longest uninterrupted term by 24 August 2020, ahead of Eisaku Satō's 2,797 days. He resigned on 28 August 2020 due to health concerns.

Background

Scandals 
In March 2018, it was revealed that the Finance Ministry (with finance minister Tarō Asō at its head) had falsified documents presented to the parliament in relation to the Moritomo Gakuen scandal, to remove 14 passages implicating Abe. It has been suggested that the scandal could cost Abe his seat as the Liberal Democratic Party's leader. A Kyodo poll showed the Japanese government popularity's has fallen as low as 30% from 44% in February.

Candidates

Nominated

Expressed intention but did not have enough votes for nomination 
Seiko Noda, then-Interior Minister.

Speculative  
Tarō Kōno, current Foreign Minister. Son of Yōhei Kōno, a former Speaker of the House of Representatives. 
Tarō Asō, current Finance Minister and former Prime Minister of Japan. Grandson of former Prime Minister Shigeru Yoshida.
Shinjiro Koizumi, First Vice Secretary-General of the LDP and son of former Prime Minister Junichiro Koizumi.

Declined 
Fumio Kishida, current chair of the LDP Policy Research Council and former Foreign Minister in the Second and Third Abe Cabinet.

Results

References 

2018 elections in Japan
Political party leadership elections in Japan
Liberal Democratic Party (Japan)
Indirect elections
Liberal Democratic Party (Japan) leadership election